The 2017–18 English Football League (known as the Sky Bet Football League for sponsorship reasons) was the 119th season of the English Football League and was the second under its current name. It began on 4 August 2017 and concluded on 6 May 2018, with the promotion play-off finals at Wembley Stadium on 26–28 May 2018. The EFL is contested through three divisions. The divisions are the Championship, League One and League Two. The winner and the runner up of the Championship will be automatically promoted to the Premier League and they will be joined by the winner of the Championship playoff. The bottom two teams in League Two will be relegated to the National League.

Promotion and relegation

From the Premier League
 Relegated to the Championship
 Hull City
 Middlesbrough
 Sunderland

From the Championship
 Promoted to the Premier League
 Brighton & Hove Albion
 Newcastle United
 Huddersfield Town
 Relegated to League One
 Rotherham United
 Wigan Athletic
 Blackburn Rovers

From League One
 Promoted to the Championship
 Sheffield United
 Bolton Wanderers
 Millwall
 Relegated to League Two
 Chesterfield
 Coventry City
 Swindon Town
 Port Vale

From League Two
 Promoted to League One
 Doncaster Rovers
 Plymouth Argyle
 Portsmouth
 Blackpool
 Relegated to the National League
 Leyton Orient
 Hartlepool United

From the National League
 Promoted to League Two
 Lincoln City
 Forest Green Rovers

Championship

Table

Play-offs

Results

League One

Table

Play-offs

Results

League Two

Table

Play-offs

Results

Managerial changes

References

 
2017-18